Chinese-style modernization, also called the Chinese modernization or the Chinese path to modernization, is a political slogan promoted by the Chinese Communist Party (CCP), touting a model of modernization that contrasts with Western-style development, and emphasizing the strengths of the Chinese economic and political model.

History 
The term dates back to 1979, when Chinese leader Deng Xiaoping, who mentioned it during a March 1979 speech about the Four Cardinal Principles.

It became a standalone phrase in its own right under CCP general secretary Xi Jinping when, in April 2021, the People's Daily launched several articles on "dissecting Chinese-style modernization", leading rest of the Chinese state media to do the same. Wang Huning, top political theorist under Xi, is considered to be related in developing the term.

The term featured prominently at the CCP "historical resolution" under Xi, that passed in 2021. The resolution said that Chinese-style modernization would further drive the "great rejuvenation of the Chinese nation". The term appeared 11 times at Xi's political report to the 20th CCP National Congress. The term also was featured prominently at the 2023 National People's Congress.

Overview 
The term has been seen as an effort by Xi to focus on strengthening China's position in the world. It has also been used by Chinese leaders to envision a new type of development in the world; Xi said that Chinese-style modernization "breaks the myth of ‘modernization equals Westernization". According to Xi, Chinese-style modernization has "five characteristics" and "nine basic demands":

In particular, achieving common prosperity is considered one of the key tenets of Chinese-style modernization under Xi; Zhang Zhanbin, an official at the CCP Central Party School wrote to the People's Daily that understanding the role of common prosperity is crucial to "clearly recognizing the major differences between Chinese-style modernization and the Western modernization path."

References 

Slogans
Xi Jinping
Ideology of the Chinese Communist Party